A list of films produced by the Marathi language film industry based in Maharashtra in the year 1934.

1934 Releases
A list of Marathi films released in 1934.

References

External links
Gomolo - 

Lists of 1934 films by country or language
1934
1934 in Indian cinema